José Horacio Gómez Velasco (born December 26, 1951) is a Mexican-born American prelate of the Catholic Church. He became the fifth archbishop of the Archdiocese of Los Angeles in California in 2011. He previously served as an auxiliary bishop of the Archdiocese of Denver in Colorado from 2001 to 2004 and as archbishop of the Archdiocese of San Antonio in Texas from 2004 to 2010.

Beginning on November 15, 2016, Gómez served as vice president of the United States Conference of Catholic Bishops (USCCB); his term as vice president ended with his election as president on November 12, 2019. He was the first person of Hispanic descent to hold both positions. His three-year presidential term ended on November 15, 2022 with the election of Archbishop Timothy Broglio.

Early life and education
José Gómez was born on December 26, 1951, in Monterrey, Mexico, to José H. Gómez and Esperanza Velasco. He has three older sisters and one younger sister. He attended the Monterrey Institute of Technology in Monterrey, Mexico before entering the National University of Mexico in Mexico City, where he earned a Bachelor of Science in Accounting and a Bachelor of Philosophy degree in 1975. While attending college, Gómez joined Opus Dei, a Catholic organization founded by Saint Josemaría Escrivá.

From 1975 to 1980, Gómez studied at the University of Navarre in Pamplona, Spain, earning his Bachelor of Theology degree and Licentiate of Theology .

Priesthood
On August 15, 1978, Gómez was ordained a priest of Opus Dei by Cardinal Franz König at the Shrine of Torreciudad in Aragon, Spain. In 1980, Gómez obtained a Doctor of Sacred Theology degree from the University of Navarre. He then pursued pastoral work with college and high school students in Spain and Mexico. From 1987 to 1999, Gómez was in residence at Our Lady of Grace Parish in San Antonio, Texas, where he assisted in the pastoral work of the parish. During this period, he also helped in the Diocese of Galveston-Houston in Katy, Texas. Gómez became a U.S. citizen in 1995.

In 1991, Gómez became a regional representative of the National Association of Hispanic Priests. He became its president in 1995 and served as executive director from 1999 to 2001. In 2003, he earned the annual Association Award, "El Buen Pastor". From 1997 to 1998, he served as a member-at-large on the board of directors for the National Catholic Council of Hispanic Ministry, and was elected its treasurer in 1999. From 1998 to 2000, Gómez was on the steering committee for Encuentro 2000, a national celebration of the Jubilee Year 2000. 

Along with Cardinal Norberto Carrera, Gómez played a key role in the establishment of the Hispanic Seminary of Our Lady of Guadalupe in Mexico City, which opened in August 2000. He also spearheaded the establishment of Centro San Juan Diego for Family and Pastoral Care, a place for formation of lay leaders and a base to provide welcoming services to immigrants, in Denver, Colorado. In 1999, he became the vicar of Opus Dei for Texas.

Episcopal career

Auxiliary Bishop of Denver

On January 23, 2001, Pope John Paul II appointed Gómez auxiliary bishop of the Archdiocese of Denver and titular bishop of Belali. He received his episcopal consecration on March 26, 2001, from Archbishop Charles J. Chaput, with Bishops Joseph Fiorenza and Javier Rodríguez as co-consecrators. Gómez chose as his episcopal motto "Adeamus cum fiducia ad thronum gratiae", meaning "Let us confidently approach the throne of grace" (Hebrews 4:16).

Gómez was the first numerary member of Opus Dei to be consecrated a bishop in the United States. As a bishop, he is no longer a member of that organization since he reports to the pope and thus does not answer to the prelate in charge of Opus Dei. Gómez has said he is not a "member" of Opus Dei, but rather that he was ordained a priest in Opus Dei and that his spirituality reflects that background.

Gómez served as rector of the Cathedral of the Immaculate Conception in Denver from 2001 to 2003. He next served as both moderator of the curia and pastor of Mother of God Church.

Archbishop of San Antonio

Gómez was appointed archbishop of the Archdiocese of San Antonio on December 29, 2004. In 2005, he was named one of Time's 25 most influential Hispanics in the United States, and in 2007 he was on CNN's list of "Notable Hispanics" in a web special celebrating Hispanic Heritage Month. In 2006,  Gómez officially introduced The Catholic Community Foundation for the Catholic Church of the Archdiocese of San Antonio. In 2007, he was instrumental in bringing together Hispanic leaders and Catholic bishops for the creation of the Catholic Association of Latino Leaders (CALL).

During his tenure in San Antonio, Gómez earned a reputation as an orthodox leader who reversed some of the more liberal-leaning initiatives in the diocese. He disbanded the chancery's Justice and Peace Commission after its members expressed their opposition to his support of a state constitutional amendment that banned same-sex marriage. During the 2008 US presidential election, he publicly expressed concern when St. Mary's University in San Antonio allowed candidate Hillary Clinton, who supported abortion rights for women, to hold a campaign event on campus. Gómez also voiced concerns when another Catholic university, Our Lady of the Lake University in San Antonio allowed a high-profile nun who some claim supports female ordination to be a keynote speaker at an event. He welcomed Summorum Pontificum, which granted greater freedom to the Tridentine Mass, saying it would preserve "the rich heritage and legacy of the Church".

Gómez is a member of the Pontifical Commission for Latin America in the Roman Curia and is a board member for the Catholic University of America in Washington, D.C. As a USCCB member, he is chairman of the Subcommittee for the Church in Latin America; in the latter capacity, he led a three-bishop delegation to Haiti to assess the situation there following its 2010 earthquake. He is also chair of the Committee on Migration, chairman of the Task Force on the Spanish-language Bible, and a member of the Committee on Doctrine.

Archbishop of Los Angeles

On April 6, 2010, Gómez was appointed coadjutor archbishop of the Archdiocese of Los Angeles by Pope Benedict XVI. The Archdiocese of Los Angeles is the largest Catholic diocese in the nation, with Hispanics comprising more than two-thirds of the archdiocese's five million Catholics. Gómez succeeded Cardinal Roger Mahony on March 1, 2011, with a transition ceremony held on February 27, 2011. He is the first Hispanic to serve as archbishop of Los Angeles, as well as the highest-ranking Hispanic bishop in the United States. He said: "I'm very grateful to the Holy Father for giving me this opportunity to serve the Church with a mentor and leader like Cardinal Roger Mahony. I'm grateful to the Apostolic Nuncio, Archbishop Pietro Sambi, for supporting the Holy Father's confidence in me. I will try with all my strength to earn that trust."Considered theologically conservative, Gómez is also viewed as "a natural conciliator admired for uniting rich and poor and Anglo and Hispanic Catholics". He is regarded as more conservative than his predecessor, Cardinal Mahony. Addressing this belief, however, Mahony said that "these labels of 'conservative' and 'liberal' are really unhelpful in the life of the church" and "I can attest that both of us share a common commitment to Christ and to the Church, and that both of us are interested in promoting the teachings of the Church fully as well as bringing the words and example of Christ to today's society and world." Gómez also said it would be wrong for observers to conclude he was a conservative because he was a priest of Opus Dei.

On September 18, 2012, Pope Benedict XVI appointed Archbishop Gómez one of the Synod Fathers for the 13th Ordinary General Assembly of the Synod of Bishops on the New Evangelization in October 2012.On November 24, 2012, he was appointed a member of the Pontifical Council for Social Communications.

On January 31, 2013, Gómez stated that Mahony would "no longer have any administrative or public duties" for the Los Angeles Archdiocese. The announcement came as Gómez unveiled its files related to clergy sexual abuse. He said: "I find these files to be brutal and painful reading. The behavior described in these files is terribly sad and evil. There is no excuse, no explaining away what happened to these children. The priests involved had the duty to be their spiritual fathers and they failed.  We need to acknowledge that terrible failure today."Under Gómez's stewardship and with his blessing, the Queen of Angels Foundation, a public association of the faithful under canon law founded by Mark Anchor Albert, has since 2011 revived the lapsed custom of sponsoring a Marian procession and Votive Mass in commemoration of the founding of the City of Los Angeles on September 4, 1781. Since 2012, Gómez has been the principal celebrant of this annual Mass in honour of Nuestra Señora de los Ángeles (Our Lady of the Angels).

On Friday, November 14, 2014, during the fall USCCB meeting,  Gómez was elected as a delegate to the 2015 World Synod of Bishops on the Family, pending Vatican approval.On November 15, 2016, he was elected vice-president of the USCCB, and on November 12, 2019, he was elected USCCB president. He is the first Latino bishop to hold the post.

Views and theology

Immigration
In 2013, Gómez published Immigration and the Next America, connecting the rights of immigrants to the highest principles of the American tradition.

Abortion
Gómez has stated in the past that abortion "is not a 'Catholic' issue. It is a matter of fundamental human rights" and that defending life "is an essential part of the Catholic faith". He has lamented politicians publicly calling for looser abortion laws, suggesting that politicians, Catholics included, choose "very public platforms to make misleading statements about it".

Gómez  publicly criticized then-Senator Joe Biden (himself a Catholic) for his past comments on abortion. Gómez wrote a statement to be released on January 20, 2021, the day of Biden's inauguration as US president which warned that the incoming administration's policy agenda would advance “moral evils” on several fronts, including abortion, gender, and religious liberty. The statement was blocked by the Vatican Secretariat of State hours before it was due to be released. It was eventually released several hours after the Holy See released a communique from Pope Francis extending "cordial good wishes" to Biden.

Following the 2022 ruling Dobbs v. Jackson Women's Health Organization, Gomez issued a statement praising the ruling as USCCB president.

Euthanasia
In mid-2015, Gómez sent a letter to the Health Committee of the California State Assembly to voice his objections to a vote on legislation that would permit adults with a terminal illness to seek medication from a doctor to end their lives. In it, Gómez urged the members to reject legislation that "has dangerous implications for our state, especially the poor and the most vulnerable". He added that "helping someone die – even if that person is desperate and asks for the help – is still killing".

Gómez has also said that legalizing euthanasia "is the beginning of tyranny" in which "we are crossing a line – from being a society that cares for those who are aging and sick to a society that kills those whose suffering we can no longer tolerate". Gómez reflected upon the fact that euthanasia was a moral failure that also invites ambiguities over how such policies may be practiced, believing that it would also worsen the inequalities in the healthcare system.

Racism
In 2020,  Gómez issued a statement on behalf of the USCCB in which he condemned the murder of George Floyd in Minneapolis, Minnesota, as "senseless and brutal". He said that the protests following Floyd's murder reflected "the justified frustration and anger of millions", taking the opportunity to condemn the "humiliation, indignity, and unequal opportunity" based on race. Gómez called for greater tolerance and to ensure that racism is removed from all aspects of the community to foster greater harmony.

See also

 Catholic Church hierarchy
 Catholic Church in the United States
 Historical list of the Catholic bishops of the United States
 List of Catholic bishops of the United States
 Lists of patriarchs, archbishops, and bishops

Sources
 "Most Reverend José H. Gómez, S.T.D." Retrieved June 4, 2010
 "Excelentísimo Monseñor José H. Gómez, S.T.D." Retrieved June 4, 2010 
 Fox News – Dispute with Nuns Over Convent is far from Over July 30, 2015

References

External links 

 Archbishop Jose H. Gomez, Archdiocese of Los Angeles
 Fox News Report – Dispute with Nuns is Far from over

1951 births
Living people
Mexican Roman Catholic priests
Mexican emigrants to the United States
Opus Dei members
Clergy from Monterrey
Roman Catholic archbishops of San Antonio
Roman Catholic archbishops of Los Angeles
Catholic University of America trustees
University of Navarra alumni
National Autonomous University of Mexico alumni
Members of the Pontifical Council for Social Communications
Roman Catholic Archdiocese of Denver
21st-century Roman Catholic archbishops in the United States
Members of the Order of the Holy Sepulchre
Monterrey Institute of Technology and Higher Education alumni
Mexican Roman Catholic archbishops